Ozzy is the third album by Canadian alternative/indie rock band hHead, released in 1996. It was recorded and released on Handsome Boy Records, after IRS Records closed down.

Track listing 
"Got" - 3:47
"Cage" - 3:30
"Apartment" - 3:31
"Teasing" - 4:04
"Ozzy" - 2:43
"Waiting" - 4:46
"Bellybutton" - 4:47
"Learn" - 3:02
"Want" - 2:42
"Flipped" - 3:12
"Kids" - 3:41
"Cockeyed" - 4:33

1996 albums
HHead albums